Laño is a hamlet and concejo (a small administrative subdivision) in Condado de Treviño within the Treviño enclave; which is administratively part of the Spanish province of Burgos, but which is completely surrounded by the territory of the Basque country province of Álava. It is best known for the fossils of extinct vertebrates dating from around 70 million years before present which have been found there.

Palaeontology
The Paleontology Unit of the University of the Basque Country and other scientists have studied the fossil record at Laño. The fossils are from the late Cretaceous (late Campanian to lower Maastrichtian). It has been inferred that there was then a braided riverbed at the site, that the sea was nearby, and that the climate was tropical or sub-tropical.

Taxa identified at Laño include:
 Arcovenator sp., a species of abelisaurid dinosaur
 Acynodon iberoccitanus, a species of crocodilian in genus Acynodon
 Dortoka vasconica, a species of turtle in genus Dortoka in family Dortokidae in sub-order Pleurodira
 Gargantuavis, a genus of bird
 Herensugea caristiorum, a species of snake in genus Herensugea in family Madtsoiidae
 Lainodon orueetxebarriai, a species of placental mammal in genus Lainodon in family Zhelestidae
 Lirainosaurus astibiae, a species of sauropod dinosaur in genus Lirainosaurus
 Menarana laurasiae, a species of snake in genus Menarana
 Musturzabalsuchus buffetauti, a species of crocodilian in genus Musturzabalsuchus
 Polysternon atlanticum, a species of turtle in genus Polysternon
 Solemys vermiculata, a species of turtle in genus Solemys in family Helochelydridae
 Rhabdodon, a genus of ornithopod
 Struthiosaurus, a genus of ankylosaur
 Taveirosaurus, a genus of ornithischian dinosaur
 Tarascosaurus a genus of abelisaurid dinosaur
 ?Pyroraptor, a genus of dromaeosaurid dinosaur

Gallery

References

Populated places in the Province of Burgos
Paleontology in Spain
Late Cretaceous